Hatari are an Icelandic techno, industrial and punk rock band and performance art group from Reykjavík. Their public image incorporates elements of anti-capitalism and BDSM attire. The band currently consists of Klemens Hannigan, Einar Stefánsson, and previously Matthías Haraldsson until his departure in 2023. and has released one album and one extended play, encompassing several singles. Hatari represented Iceland in the Eurovision Song Contest 2019 with their song "Hatrið mun sigra", finishing 10th in the final.

History

Early history (2015–2018) 
Hatari was formed in mid-2015 by cousins Klemens Hannigan and Matthías Haraldsson. At the time, Klemens had begun writing electronic music that Matthías would provide screaming vocals for. Klemens later presented the songs to Einar Stefánsson, who joined the duo as their drummer. Klemens and Einar, together with drummer Sólrún Mjöll Kjartansdóttir, had previously also formed the band Kjurr in late 2012; in the band, Klemens played the guitar and provided vocals, while Einar played the bass. Throughout 2016, Hatari performed five times, including appearances in Reykjavík, at Eistnaflug, at LungA Festival, and at Norðanpaunk, prior to their break-out performances at Iceland Airwaves, held at Kex Hostel in Reykjavík, on 31 October and 6 November 2016. The band's debut extended play (EP), named Neysluvara, was released through Svikamylla ehf. via Spotify and Bandcamp on 31 October 2017. Leading up to the EP's release, the band also released music videos for two songs from the EP, "Ódýr" and "X". In December 2017, Hatari was featured on the song "Hlauptu", released on the album Horror by Cyber.

On 21 December 2018, Hatari announced that the board of directors of Svikamylla ehf. had passed a resolution to dissolve the band. However, Hatari did not dissolve as they appeared at Eurosonic Noorderslag, a music event held in the Netherlands, shortly after that. Simultaneous to the dissolution announcement, Hatari released the music video for a new single, "Spillingardans".

Eurovision Song Contest (2019) 
In January 2019, Hatari was confirmed as one of the ten acts competing in Söngvakeppnin 2019, Iceland's national selection for its entry in the Eurovision Song Contest 2019, with their new song "Hatrið mun sigra". Hatari won Söngvakeppnin 2019 in March that year, and thus represented Iceland in the Eurovision Song Contest in May.

In the lead-up to the competition, Hatari made headlines with a number of political statements over the Israeli occupation of Palestine and other matters, resulting in Jon Ola Sand, the executive supervisor of the European Broadcasting Union (EBU), warning them that they had reached the limit of the EBU's patience, and would be disqualified should they choose to bring its political statements to the stage. However, when Iceland's televote score was announced at the end of the final, members of Hatari held up banners displaying the flag of Palestine. Overall, Hatari received 232 points in the final, finishing in 10th place.

Subsequent releases and tours (2019–present) 
On 23 May 2019, the day of their homecoming concert, Hatari released "Klefi / صامد", a single featuring Palestinian musician Bashar Murad, with a music video. The video was filmed in the desert by Jericho, Palestine, and the song features lyrics in Icelandic and Arabic. A further single, "Klámstrákur", was released that October. Hatari's first album, Neyslutrans, was released on 17 January 2020, also featuring the four prior singles. A remix album, Neyslutrans Remixed, was released on 19 February 2021.

On 17 July 2019, Hatari announced their 2020 "Europe Will Crumble" tour, with Cyber as their supporting act. On 29 January 2020, a few hours before their  concert at the Copenhagen venue Vega, a fire broke out, but nobody was hurt. The second of two tour legs was cancelled due to the COVID-19 pandemic. It was replaced by the "Dance or Die" tour, which was announced in November 2020 and advertised with a "post-human experience".

Members 
Hatari primarily consists of musicians Klemens Hannigan, Matthías Haraldsson, and Einar Stefánsson, as well as several contributors.

Matthías Haraldsson 
Matthías Tryggvi Haraldsson (born 1994) was a vocalist for the group. He is the son of Gunnhildur Hauksdóttir, an artist, and Haraldur Flosi Tryggvason, the owner of LMB Mandat and brother of Klemens' mother, Rán. Outside of Hatari, Matthías is a playwright; he graduated from the Iceland University of the Arts with a one-man play entitled Griðastaður ( Sanctuary), which was later shown at the Tjarnarbíó theatre in Reykjavík. Matthías subsequently won the "Newcomer of the Year" award at the Grímuverðlaunin 2019. He also acted as a news reporter for Icelandic broadcaster RÚV. He got engaged with Brynhildur Karlsdóttir and they have a daughter. He announced his departure from the group in March 2023.

Klemens Hannigan 
Klemens Nikulásson Hannigan (born 1994) is the group's vocalist, and the cousin of Matthías. He is the son of Nikulás Hannigan, the head of the trade office division at Iceland's Ministry for Foreign Affairs, and Rán Tryggvadóttir, a lawyer for legal firm LMB Mandat. Klemens has three daughters with his partner, Ronja Mogensen. He graduated from Tækniskólinn as a furniture maker.

Einar Stefánsson 
Einar Hrafn Stefánsson (also known as Einar Stef) is the drummer and producer for the group. He is the son of Stefán Haukur Jóhannesson, the Icelandic ambassador to Japan, and former ambassador to the United Kingdom. Outside Hatari, he is also the bassist of Vök, an Icelandic indie pop and electronica group formed in 2013. Einar is in a relationship with Sólbjört and they have a daughter.

Contributors 
Contributors for Hatari currently include Sólbjört Sigurðardóttir, and previously Sigurður Andrean Sigurgeirsson and Ástrós Guðjónsdóttir until their departures in 2022, all of whom are considered part of Hatari. Sólbjört acts as a choreographer and dancer for the group, Ástrós and Andrean were previously acted as choreographers and dancers for the group. While Sólbjört also provides backing vocals, Ástrós had also previously provided backing vocals.  Sólbjört first joined the group as a dancer in 2016, acting alongside Ronja Mogensen, who had previously done the group's make-up. Due to pregnancies and other influences, the backing line-up changed several times; the line-up with Sólbjört, Andrean and Ástrós was arranged by Sólbjört in the preparations for Söngvakeppnin 2019. Andri Hrafn Unnarsson and Karen Briem are costume designers for Hatari, and Ingi Kristján Sigurmarsson acts as their graphic artist. In 2022, Íris Tanja Flygenring joined to Hatari as a touring dancer, which made as a result as Ástrós went to her motherhood life. As for 2023, only Sólbjört Sigurðardóttir remains as a dancer and choreographer of the group. Ástrós left the group due to pregnancies and Andrean decided not to dance with the group due to personal reasons.

Discography

Albums

Extended plays

Remix albums

Singles

Awards and nominations

References

External links 

 

2015 establishments in Iceland
Eurovision Song Contest entrants of 2019
Icelandic electronic music groups
Eurovision Song Contest entrants for Iceland
Icelandic performance artists
Icelandic punk rock groups
Musical groups from Reykjavík
Industrial music groups